The Baring family is a German and British family of merchants and bankers. In Germany, the family belongs to the Bildungsbürgertum, and in England, it belongs to the aristocracy.

History
The family's earliest known ancestor is Peter Baring (or Petrus Baring), who was a burgher of the city of Groningen, then a semi-independent city-state that was part of the Holy Roman Empire and the Hanseatic League, now part of the Netherlands, around 1500. Peter Baring's son Franz Baring (Franciscus Baringius) became the first Lutheran bishop of Lauenburg in what is now Lower Saxony in Germany from 1565. The current family in Germany and England is descended from Franz Baring. In the Electorate of Hanover, the Baring family belonged to the upper bourgeoisie, the so-called Hübsche Familien (from hübsch, pretty, or good looking), which comprised the third division of the ruling class of the Holy Roman Empire, after the nobility and the clergy.

The English branch of the family is descended from Franz Baring (1657–1697), a professor of theology in Bremen. He was the father of Johann Baring (1697–1748), who moved from his hometown of Bremen to Exeter in England to take up an apprenticeship with a wool-exporter in 1717. Over the years, Johann Baring, who was later also known as John, built a small fortune as a wool merchant. His sons Francis and John Baring moved to London, where in 1762 they founded the John and Francis Baring Company, commonly known as Barings Bank. Barings Bank became one of the leading London merchant banks, until it collapsed in 1995. Francis Baring was the father of Sir Thomas Baring, 2nd Baronet, and grandfather to Francis Baring, 1st Baron Northbrook. He was also father to Alexander Baring, 1st Baron Ashburton, and through his third son Henry Baring the grandfather of Edward Baring, 1st Baron Revelstoke, and Evelyn Baring, 1st Earl of Cromer.

Arnulf Baring (19322019) was a member of the branch of the family remaining in Germany.

Since the early 19th century, the Baring family maintained close relations with the Berenberg family of bankers.

Hereditary titles
The Baring family is one of the most titled in the United Kingdom, since several family members were created peers or baronets. The family has held the following British peerage titles:

Baron Ashburton (created 1835)
Baron Northbrook (created 1866)
Earl of Northbrook and Viscount Baring (created 1876; extinct 1929)
Baron Revelstoke (created 1885)
Earl of Cromer and Viscount Errington (created 1901)
also Baron Cromer (created 1892) and Viscount Cromer (created 1899)
Baron Howick of Glendale (created 1960)

In addition, two baronetcies have been created for members of the family (in 1793 and 1911):
see Baring baronets

Gallery

Family tree

References

External links
 

 
Banking families
German families
Businesspeople from Bremen